James Raymond Carter Gaudino (born March 27, 1964) is a retired Puerto Rican basketball player. Carter spent most of his career as a point guard for the Brujos de Guayama of the Baloncesto Superior Nacional (BSN). Carter is currently the all-time assists leader of the league. During his 20-year career, he also played for the Indios de Mayagüez, Criollos de Caguas, Maratonistas de Coamo, and Capitanes de Arecibo.  Carter also played since 1992 to the year 2000 for the Explosivos de Moca of the Liga de Baloncesto Puertorriqueña.

Professional career 
Carter led the Brujos de Guayama to the Finals twice in his career (1991 and 1994), losing to the Atléticos de San Germán on both occasions. 

Carter was selected as one of the league's best players of the 1990s, along with Eddie Casiano, Javier "Toñito" Colón, Edgar León and José "Piculín" Ortiz.

National Team career 
Carter also played for the Puerto Rico National Basketball Team and was one of the members of the team that won the gold medal at the 1994 Goodwill Games in St. Petersburg, Russia.

Personal life 
James has a brother called B.J. Carter who also played at the BSN.

After retiring, Carter has participated in several charity tournaments with other players and celebrities.

References

External links
James Carter Profile on BSNPR.com

1964 births
Living people
Baloncesto Superior Nacional players
Basketball players at the 1992 Summer Olympics
Basketball players at the 1995 Pan American Games
Mexico Aztecas players
Olympic basketball players of Puerto Rico
Pan American Games competitors for Puerto Rico
Point guards
Puerto Rican men's basketball players
1990 FIBA World Championship players
Puerto Rico men's national basketball team players
Sport Club Corinthians Paulista basketball players
Basketball players from New York City
St. Thomas Aquinas Spartans men's basketball players
Tulsa Fast Breakers players
United States Basketball League players
1998 FIBA World Championship players
Goodwill Games medalists in basketball
Competitors at the 1994 Goodwill Games
Criollos de Caguas basketball players
1994 FIBA World Championship players